Vasile Mănăilă (born 22 November 1962 in Bordușani) is a Romanian football coach and a former player who played as a defender.

Club career
Vasile Mănăilă was born on 22 November 1962 in Bordușani, Ialomița County, moving with his parents at age 7 to live in Constanța. He started playing football as a child at Farul Constanța's youth center, his first coach being Iosif Bükössy, afterwards working more with Constantin Tâlvescu. He made his Divizia A debut on 26 September 1981 under coach Emanoil Hașoti, playing for Farul Constanța in a 3–0 away loss against UTA Arad. He played three seasons at Farul including one in Divizia B. In 1984 Mănăilă went to play for Universitatea Craiova, spending 7 seasons and a half there, winning the 1990–91 Divizia A under the guidance of coach Sorin Cârțu in which he contributed with 30 appearances and two goals scored, also winning the 1990–91 Cupa României and appearing in 19 matches in European competitions. After his spell at Universitatea Craiova ended, he returned at Farul Constanța for three seasons and a half, having a total of 299 Divizia A appearances with 24 goals scored. Mănăilă ended his playing career by spending two seasons as a player and an assistant coach at Divizia B team, ARO Câmpulung. Afterwards he worked as a coach at junior level at Farul Constanța and Viitorul Constanța, also being an assistant coach of Ștefan Stoica at Farul's senior squad.

International career
Vasile Mănăilă played a single match for Romania under coach Mircea Rădulescu on 28 August 1991 in a friendly against USA which ended with a 2–0 loss.

Honours
Universitatea Craiova
Divizia A: 1990–91
Cupa României: 1990–91

Notes

References

External links

Living people
1962 births
Romanian footballers
CS Universitatea Craiova players
FCV Farul Constanța players
Liga I players
Liga II players
Association football defenders
Romania under-21 international footballers
Romania international footballers